Anders Hansson (10 March 1992 – 30 October 2020) was a male Swedish racewalker.

Career
He competed in the 50 kilometres walk event at the 2015 World Championships in Athletics in Beijing, China, but did not finish. In 2018, he competed in the men's 50 kilometres walk at the 2018 European Athletics Championships held in Berlin, Germany. He finished in 23rd place.

Hansson died of cancer on 30 October 2020.

See also
 Sweden at the 2015 World Championships in Athletics

References

Swedish male racewalkers
1992 births
2020 deaths
World Athletics Championships athletes for Sweden
20th-century Swedish people
21st-century Swedish people